Neelam or Neelum is a given name, taken from the Sanskrit word for sapphire.

People with the name
 Neelam Saxena Chandra (born 1969), Indian poet and author
 Neelam Ibrar Chattan (born 1994), Pakistani human rights activist
 Neelam Chaturvedi (born 1960), Indian human rights activist
 Neelam Mansingh Chowdhry (born 1951), Indian theatre artist
 Neelam Deo, Indian ambassador
 Neelam Giri, Indian pediatric hematologist/oncologist 
 Neelam Gill (born 1995), British model
 Neelam Gorhe (born 1954), Maharashtra politician
 Neelum Saran Gour (born 1955), Indian writer
 Neelam Jain (born 1954), Indian Jain journalist
 Neelam Kler, Indian neonatologist
 Neelam Kothari (born 1968), Indian Hindi film actress and jewellery designer
 Neelam Mehra, Indian Hindi television and film actress
 Neelam Muneer, Pakistani actress and model
 Neelam Karki Niharika, Nepalese writer
 Neelam Sanjiva Reddy (1913–1996), sixth President of India
 Neelam Shirke (born 1980), actress in Marathi language television
 Neelam Jaswant Singh (born 1971), Indian discus thrower
 Neelam Sivia (born 1988), Indian actress
 Neelam Sonkar (born 1973), Uttar Pradesh politician
 Neelam Upadhyaya, Indian actress in Tamil and Telugu films
 Neelam Verma (born 1980), television anchor and Miss Universe Canada 2002

See also
 Neelam (disambiguation)

References

Indian feminine given names
Pakistani feminine given names
Sanskrit-language names